Arlon-Bastogne-Marche-Neufchâteau-Virton was a constituency used to elect members of the Belgian Chamber of Representatives between 1999 and 2003.

Representatives

References

Defunct constituencies of the Chamber of Representatives (Belgium)